Butkovka is a rural locality (a selo) in Vodnobuyerachnoye Rural Settlement, Kamyshinsky District, Volgograd Oblast, Russia. The population was 44 as of 2010.

Geography 
Butkovka is located on the Volga Upland, on the west bank of the Volgograd Reservoir, 63 km northeast of Kamyshin (the district's administrative centre) by road. Galka is the nearest rural locality.

References 

Rural localities in Kamyshinsky District